Smells Like Bleach: A Punk Tribute To Nirvana is a tribute album by various artists to the American grunge band Nirvana, released in 2001.

The album's title came from the amalgamation of Nirvana's signature song "Smells Like Teen Spirit" and their debut album Bleach. It contains twelve Nirvana songs from different releases, mainly Nirvana's second studio album, Nevermind, and despite the title only a single song comes from Bleach.

Track listing

Song information
 Tracks 1-5, 7-8 were originally performed on the album Nevermind.
 Track 6 was originally performed on the album Bleach.
 Tracks 9-10 were originally performed on the album In Utero.
 Track 11 was originally performed on the album Incesticide.
 Track 12 was originally performed on the "Sliver" single.

Liner notes
The liner notes to Smells Like Bleach were written by Dave Thompson.  In it, he describes Smells Like Bleach as Nirvana's "first ever tribute album."  In actual fact, the tribute album Smells Like Nirvana: A Tribute to Nirvana was released before Smells Like Bleach (6 June 2000).

In the seventh paragraph, Thompson writes that "if the Hall of Fame has not collapsed beneath the weight of its own oxymoronic irrelevance by then, watch for Krist Novoselic and Dave Grohl to be invited out to Cleveland sometime around the year 2017."

Artists become eligible for induction into the performers category of the Rock and Roll Hall of Fame twenty-five years after the releases of their first records.  Thompson was postulating that Nirvana would be indicted in 2017 because 2017 marks the twenty-fifth anniversary of Nirvana's second studio album, Nevermind, reaching number one on the Billboard charts (11 January 1992).  But, since their first studio album, "Bleach", was released 15 June 1989, the first year Nirvana was actually eligible for induction into the Hall of Fame was 2014.  As it so turns out, Nirvana was indeed inducted into the Hall of Fame in their first year of eligibility (10 April 2014), and the induction ceremony was held Brooklyn, New York, at the Barclays Center, not Cleveland.

Notes

Nirvana (band) tribute albums
Punk rock compilation albums
2001 compilation albums
Cleopatra Records compilation albums